Maha Maha (Tamil: மகா மகா, English: Great Great) is a 2015 Indian Tamil romantic thriller film written and directed by Mathivanan Sakthivel. The film stars Mathivanan Sakthivel and Melissa in the lead roles, while Indira, Nizhalgal Ravi, Anupama Kumar and Meera Krishnan play supporting roles. The film features music composed by Pavalar Shiva, and editing by Suresh Urs.

The film was predominantly filmed in Australia with local Australian cast. The film released on 6 March 2015 in Tamil Nadu, Australia and England.

Plot 
The hero, Vijay (Mathivanan Sakthivel), relocates to Australia as a result of his job transfer. There he meets an Australian girl, Emily Anderson (Melissa), and falls in love. Meanwhile, the Australian police are in search of Emily, who has claimed to be missing for the past 10 days. Meantime, the police finds the dead body of Emily, who was killed and buried in Vijay's garden, and hence, Vijay is arrested. Emily's postmortem report says that she was murdered and was buried. Further, it shocks the police as they find that Vijay had actually arrived at Australia a day after Emily's murder. As a result, Vijay is released by the police. Following which, Vijay is all set himself to find about Emily, that who was she actually, who would have murdered her and what would have been the reason behind it, how is it possible for a dead girl to meet and speak with him. Finally, all these investigations result to unfold many interesting and shocking informations.

Cast 

Mathivanan Sakthivel as Vijay Sankaran
Melissa as Emily Anderson
Indira as Anushri
Nizhalgal Ravi as Dr. Mohan
Anupama Kumar as Aunty
Meera Krishnan
Charmili as Sujatha
Tim Crowe as Drug Addict
Danny Elayoubi as John Watson
Marion Fernandez as Dr. Maya Charles
James Preston as Car Thief
Kim Richardson as Psychic
Sasitharan Sakthivel as Avi
Charlotte Wood as Emily's mother
Duncan Munro as Police officer
Nick Gottum as Emily's father

Release 
The film released on 6 March 2015 in Tamil Nadu, Australia and England. The film was released along with 10 other films.

Production 
The film is produced by Sakthi Screens and it was written and directed by Mathivanan Sakthivel. Mathivanan did a short course in film making at the Australian Film Base in Sydney before production of this film. The film was predominantly filmed in Australia in a small country town Taralga.

Music 
The film has three tracks composed by Pavalar Shiva, who is Ilayaraja's brother's (Pavalar Varadarajan's) son.

The audio was released by Ilayaraja. He commented that the songs are good and he liked the title of the film "Maha Maha".

The Hindu reported that there are only three tracks in the album, all of which are pleasing to the ears. ‘Ennavo Pannuthe’ is sung by Nivas K. Prasanna and Prashanthini, while ‘Agaramodu Lagaram’ is sung by Prashanthini, Priya and Vallavan. Pavalar Siva's rendition of the title number ‘Maha Maha’ is good.

Critical reception 
Vannathirai Magazine review said that the movie does not have much commercial element, however the director has done a fast pace screenplay for which he needs to be congratulated.

Maalai Malar review reported that Mathivanan has done what is required for his role and Melissa has fulfilled the job that is given to her. The review also praised the director for using the Australian actors properly. The review highlighted that the screen play is bit slow for a crime thriller.

A critic from Nettv4u opined that "it is worth watching, with different story with new leads and known character artists. Maha Maha…. Mathivanan’s classy debut!"

Awards 

Maha Maha won its first Award, the "Award of Recognition" from  "The IndieFEST Film Awards" based in California, USA in July 2015.

Maha Maha also won the "Award of Recognition" from  "Accolade Global Film Competition" based in California, USA in August 2015.

Other-language versions 

Maha Maha was dubbed as Saaya Ek Pyar Ka in Hindi. The Hindi version of the movie was released in April 2019.

Maha Maha was dubbed as Moogamanasu Cheppindhi in Telugu. The Telugu version of the movie was released in January 2019.

References

External links

 Maha Maha
 
 
 
 

2015 films
Indian thriller drama films
Tamil-language psychological thriller films
2015 psychological thriller films
Indian multilingual films
2015 romantic drama films
Indian romantic drama films
Films shot in Australia
Films shot in Sydney
Films shot in Chennai